Frederick Lowten Spinks (27 December 1816 – 27 December 1899) was a Conservative Party politician.

Spinks first stood for election in Oldham at the 1865 general election, but was unsuccessful, and this fate was repeated in 1868. He finally secured the seat in 1874, but was defeated again in 1880.

References

External links
 

Conservative Party (UK) MPs for English constituencies
UK MPs 1874–1880
1816 births
1899 deaths